Werner Eduardo Schünemann (born February 21, 1959) is a Brazilian actor, director, and screenwriter.

Biography 
Schünemann was born in Porto Alegre, the grandson of Germans. He was raised near Novo Hamburgo and began acting at age 15. Werner was founder of the Casa de Cinema in Porto Alegre. 

He also worked as director of publicity and political campaigns for television.

Selected filmography

External links 
 

1959 births
Living people
Male actors from Porto Alegre
Brazilian people of German descent
Brazilian male film actors
Brazilian film directors
People from Novo Hamburgo
20th-century Brazilian male actors
21st-century Brazilian male actors